Elections to the Nagaland Legislative Assembly were held in February 2003 to elect members of the 60 constituencies in Nagaland, India. The Democratic Alliance of Nagaland, which was formed of the Naga People's Front, the Bharatiya Janata Party, Janata Dal (United) and the Samata Party, won a majority of seats and Neiphiu Rio was appointed as the Chief Minister of Nagaland. The number of constituencies was set as 60 by the recommendation of the Delimitation Commission of India.

Background
After the previous elections in 1998, Neiphiu Rio, was made the Home minister in S C Jamir's cabinet, but he resigned from the Congress in September 2002, accusing the chief minister of blocking a negotiated settlement on the Naga issue. After his resignation, Rio joined the Naga People's Front which partnered with other Naga regionalist parties and the state branch of the Bharatiya Janata Party under his leadership, to form the Democratic Alliance of Nagaland.

Result

Elected members

See also
List of constituencies of the Nagaland Legislative Assembly
2003 elections in India

References

2003 in Nagaland
Nagaland
State Assembly elections in Nagaland
2003